Maracaibo Province was a province of Venezuela from 1830 to 1864. Before 1830 the area was named Zulia Department. In  1864 the area was named Maracaibo State, which shortly after was renamed to Sovereign State of Zulia and in 1874 Zulia State.

Provinces of Venezuela
1830 establishments in Venezuela
es:Provincia de Maracaibo
pt:Maracaibo (província da Venezuela)